Wilmot Creek is a community located in the municipality of Clarington in Ontario, Canada.

Neighbourhoods in Clarington